Meyer Burger, headquartered in Thun, (Switzerland), is a globally active mechanical engineering company, which is primarily known for its production facilities in the photovoltaic industry. Meyer Burger develops and produces systems with which solar cells can be manufactured and electrically connected for use in solar modules. The focus is on heterojunction technology (HJT) and the exclusive SmartWire Connection Technology (SWCT). High-precision measuring systems for silicon wafers, solar cells and modules are also offered. From spring 2021, the company will produce solar cells and solar modules itself at two locations in Germany.

Meyer Burger also develops and sells industrial inkjet, plasma and microwave systems, primarily for the semiconductor and optical industries, in other divisions and through subsidiaries.

History 
Hans Meyer (1914-2001) founded a mechanical workshop in Hünibach-Eichbühl in early 1951. When Wilhelm Burger (1915-) became co-owner in 1953, the company, which developed and produced machines for the watch industry, was renamed Meyer & Burger. In 1956 they built a new factory in nearby Steffisburg. From 1960 onwards, they mainly manufactured cut-off machines and a universal machine tool UW1. They were located in Hilterfingen until 1998.

The company was founded in 1953 as a manufacturer of watch stone processing machines and subsequently specialised in special sawing machines. In 1999, the company set up a holding structure with the foundation of Meyer & Burger Holding AG in Zug and launched the first band saw for the solar industry on the market in the same year.

In the course of the growing solar industry, the company began to open up the Russian, Asian and American markets in 2003 and continued its expansion with the establishment of subsidiaries in China and Japan.

In 2006, the Group was renamed from "Meyer & Burger Holding Ltd" to "Meyer Burger Technology Ltd" and its headquarters moved to Baar. The company went public in November 2007. In 2012, the Group headquarters were relocated to Thun following the move into the new building.

Between 2010 and 2012, the Group was significantly enlarged through various corporate takeovers in order to be able to cover the entire value chain (wafer–cell–module) in photovoltaic production with its own production machines. The most important products were diamond wire saws for cutting ultra-thin silicon wafers, coating systems to build functioning solar cells from wafers, and systems for the manufacture of complete solar modules.

In the meantime, the corporate structure has been adapted and the focus has been placed on the areas of solar cell production and connection, i.e. on heterojunction cell coating and SmartWire Connection Technology (SWCTTM) for cell connection. In this context, the entire "Sawing and Cutting Technology" division was sold to Precision Surfacing Solutions in May 2019. While the company is still headquartered in Thun, Meyer Burger operates its main production site in Hohenstein-Ernstthal (Germany), where Meyer Burger acquired a majority stake in Roth & Rau in 2011.

In 2019, Meyer Burger became the largest shareholder in Oxford Photovoltaics, a spin-off company from the University of Oxford in the field of perovskite photovoltaics and solar cells. The company has developed new solar cells that extract more energy from sunshine. Meyer Burger will also mass-produce their perovskite solar cells on silicon heterojunction (HJT) tandem cells, under a strategic and exclusive cooperation agreement.

On 1 April 2020, the former chief technology officer, Gunter Erfurt, took over the position of Group CEO. He was previously managing director of Meyer Burger Germany Ltd and previously managed the main production site in Hohenstein-Ernstthal.

In June 2020, a change in strategy was announced, which will transform Meyer Burger into a technologically leading manufacturer of solar cells and solar modules. Initially, a production capacity of 400 megawatts per year is to be started at production facilities in Freiberg in Saxony and Bitterfeld-Wolfen in Saxony-Anhalt. By 2022 the capacities are to be expanded to 1.4 gigawatt cell and 0.8 gigawatt module production. In the long term, the production volume of 5 gigawatts per year is targeted. Meyer Burger manufactures the production facilities in Hohenstein-Ernstthal. The plan is to create up to 3,000 jobs.

At an Extraordinary General Meeting on 10 July 2020, the shareholders approved the transformation of the company from a supplier to a module manufacturer and the associated capital increase. In this capital increase, just under 99 percent of the subscription rights were exercised, thus raising 165 million Swiss francs. Here, Sentis Capital has committed to assume 50 million Swiss francs gross proceeds as backstop.

The change in strategy followed a public debate between the board of directors, led by Remo Lütolf as chairman and Hans Brändle as CEO, and the shareholders, including Sentis Capital and Elysium Capital, which resulted in the election of shareholder representatives Mark Kerekes and Urs Fähndrich to the board of directors. The major shareholder Sentis Capital had already demanded this strategic shift in 2018.

Heterojunction & SmartWire product 
On 11 May 2020 Uwe Rau, German physicist and well-known photovoltaic scientist from Forschungszentrum Jülich confirmed in a radio interview in Germany's largest federal state North Rhine-Westphalia that Meyer Burger's new technology in photovoltaics can be compared to the technological step from 4G to 5G in mobile technology. In addition, he said that compared to standard modules from China, Meyer Burger's technology enables to generate more electricity using less space.

According to a company investor presentation the Meyer Burger Heterojunction Module efficiency reaches similar levels to competitive products. Therefore, an average selling price premium (ASP) of up to 12 cts/Wp for same LCOE of HJT/SmartWire vs PERC modules is estimated by Meyer Burger.

Corporate structure 
In 2010 Meyer Burger merged with the previously independent company 3S Industries. The former competence centres of 3S Industries (3S Modultec, 3S Photovoltaics, Somont and Pasan) were and are since then business divisions of Meyer Burger.

Meyer Burger (Germany) GmbH 
Roth & Rau was renamed "Meyer Burger (Germany)" in 2014. The company develops and produces various systems and machines for surface treatment in the photovoltaic industry and played a key role in the industrialization of the so-called PERC (Passivated Emitter and Rear Contact) technology, which represents the current standard in solar cell production. The company also develops and builds mass production systems for the manufacture of highly efficient solar cells using heterojunction technology (HJT).

Pasan SA 
In the course of the merger with 3S Industries, Pasan became part of Meyer Burger in 2010. The company focuses on the development and manufacture of test and measurement systems for solar cells and modules. These include solar simulators, which are used by leading international certification bodies and numerous cell and module manufacturers thanks to their high accuracy and reliability. The company is headquartered in Neuchâtel, Switzerland.

Oxford Photovoltaics Ltd. 
In 2019, Meyer Burger became the largest shareholder in Oxford Photovoltaics, a spin-off company from the University of Oxford in the field of perovskite photovoltaics and solar cells. The company has developed new solar cells that extract more energy from sunshine. Meyer Burger will also mass-produce perovskite solar cells on silicon heterojunction (HJT) tandem cells as part of a strategic and exclusive cooperation agreement.

Former divisions

Meyer Burger AG (MB Wafertec) 
With the development and production of cutting and sawing systems for the solar industry, Meyer Burger's rapid growth began in 2000. The diamond wire cutting technology used today in the PV industry was primarily developed by Meyer Burger and industrialized for mass production. The entire "Sawing and Cutting Technology" division was sold to Precision Surfacing Solutions (PSS) at the end of April 2019 for CHF 50 million.

3S Solar Plus AG 
The company 3S Industries with the divisions 3S Modultec and 3S Photovoltaics among others merged with Meyer Burger in 2010 and was initially continued as the 3S Photovoltaics division. Subsequently, the two brands 3S Modultec and Solar Building Technologies were created. This division developed and produced building-integrated solar systems. The frameless solar modules of the MegaSlate brand contain solar cells between two glass layers. As a result, the modules have the same properties as laminated safety glass and can be used directly as a building housing, replacing roofing with roof tiles.

The division was later integrated into the "Energy Systems" business unit of Meyer Burger and in 2018 outsourced to the separate company 3S Solar Plus AG and sold.

AIS Automation Dresden GmbH 
Until 2019, AIS Automation Dresden GmbH also belonged to the Meyer Burger Group. As a system and software company, AIS has been developing software solutions in the field of automation technology and information technology since 1990. It acts as a full-service provider from the conception to the realization and installation of the system on site. The business areas include plant and system controls, factory automation, system integration and railway technology.

At the end of 2019, the system was sold to S&T AG in Linz (Austria).

Meyer Burger (Netherlands) B.V. 
As part of the takeover of Roth & Rau AG in 2011, Roth & Rau Netherlands B.V. (formerly OTB Solar) in Eindhoven (Netherlands), which had belonged to the Roth & Rau Group since 2010, also became part of the Meyer Burger Group. They develop and build systems for industrial inkjet printing under the PiXDRO brand. The system size ranges from compact printers for the research sector to mass production systems for various applications and industries (e.g. printed electronics, displays, OLEDs, sensors, printed circuit boards, semiconductor assembly, etching techniques, photovoltaics, optics, life sciences).
Meyer Burger (Netherlands) B.V. was sold in December 2019.

Muegge GmbH 
As part of the takeover of Roth & Rau AG in 2011, Muegge GmbH in Reichelsheim (Germany), which had belonged to the Roth & Rau Group since 2008, also became part of the Meyer Burger Group. Muegge is one of the world's leading suppliers of industrial microwaves and plasma systems. Its portfolio includes microwave generators and components as well as plasma systems for a wide variety of applications in various industries such as the semiconductor industry, OLED and MEMS production and medical technology. Muegge GmbH was sold in August 2020 as Meyer Burger moved from being an equipment provider to a supplier of solar cells and panels. The transaction provides a cash inflow of 24 million Swiss francs and book profit of 4 million Swiss francs.

Awards & achievements 

 2011: Solar Industry Award 2011 in the category "PV Process Improvement" for Somont GmbH, a company of Meyer Burger Technology Ltd.
2011: Swiss Solar Award in the category "Personalities and Institutions".
2012: Intersolar AWARD for the cell tester SpotLIGHT 1sec for Pasan AG, a company of the Meyer Burger Technology Ltd.
2012: Solar Industry Award in the Photovoltaic Tool category for its DragonBack measurement method for high efficiency modules for Pasan AG, a company of the Meyer Burger Technology Ltd.
2014: IDTechEx Printed Electronic Award for "Best Technical Development Manufacturing" to Roth & Rau B.V. (Netherlands), a member of Meyer Burger Technology Ltd.
2015: Solar Industry Award for the PCBTOUCH cell contacting solution.
2016: Technologie Highlight Award for Meyer Burger's DW288 Series 3 diamond wire cutting technology for the production of high-performance silicon solar wafers.
 2016: Solar+Power Award for its DW288 Series 3 diamond wire cutting solution with the Diamond Wire Management System (DWMS).
2016: Solar Visualised in Europe Award of the European solar industry association Solar Power Europe.
 2018: Solar + Power Award for the FABiA Cell Deposition Equipment.
2019: pv magazine AWARD in the Photovoltaic Tool category for the CAiA platform for the industrialized manufacture of solar cells with passivated contact technology for both n- and p-type wafers, which has produced cells with efficiencies slightly above 23%.

Public dispute with major shareholder and criminal investigation 
The managing director Anton Karl of Sentis Capital, the largest shareholder in 2018 with 6.14 percent, demanded already in 2018 that the company should produce solar cells and modules itself. According to Anton Karl, bankers and consultants of Meyer Burger in particular vehemently opposed his proposal and he accused them of conflicts of interest.

In the course of the ordinary general meeting on May 2, 2019, major shareholder Sentis Capital criticized the board members around Alexander Vogel with respect to the Oxford PV investment. While most Meyer Burger shareholders were excluded from the share placement with an 11% discount, some shareholders were allowed to subscribe, including the Chairman of the Board of Directors Alexander Vogel, who is said to have gained a pecuniary advantage as a result.

In addition, Alexander Vogel was criticized by Sentis Capital because the law firm Meyerlustenberger Lachenal AG, where he is a partner, received legal advisory assignments worth 8.3 million Swiss francs during his time as Chairman of the Board of Directors. This corresponded to around 73% of all fees for legal advisory services over the last few years.

Remo Lütolf, who presided over the company from May 2, 2019, hardly distanced himself from the former board of directors around Alexander Vogel. The board of directors around Lütolf considered the accusations of the major shareholder Sentis Capital and Elysium Capital in the case of the Oxford deal as baseless. Lütolf had not launched an investigation into the mandates to the law firm of the former chairman of the board of directors.

On September 22, 2019, it became known through a press report that the Bern Public Prosecutor's Office for Economic Offenses opened a criminal investigation against unknown persons on May 28, 2019, for unfaithful business conduct due to the settlement of an investment in Oxford PV. The criminal investigation does not concern the company, but former or active members of the board of directors.

In order to influence the company's strategy, Sentis Capital demanded first two, then one board seat for Sentis Capital. The CEO of the largest shareholder, Anton Karl, proposed Sentis Capital employee Mark Kerekes for the board. A public "mudslinging" ensued between the board and shareholder representatives, in which CEO Hans Brändle threatened to resign if a representative of the Sentis Group was elected to the board.

The then Chairman of the Board of Directors around Remo Lütolf and his Vice Franz Richter recommended voting against the election of Mark Kerekes at the Extraordinary General Meeting on October 30, 2019, as he would lack the necessary competence because he had no relevant experience as a board member of a listed company, an industrial company or in the solar industry. Doubts about the election of Mark Kerekes were also raised because Sentis Capital is owned by the Russian investor Petr Kondrashev, who is on the so-called "Putin List" of the US Treasury Department. This list of Russian government officials and oligarchs was created by U.S. authorities in preparation for sanctions following alleged Russian manipulation of the U.S. election and annexation of Crimea. According to Chairman Lütolf, Mark Kerekes himself was not on the list, but he was assigned to the "identifiable group of candidates" of those who could end up on it. This statement was denied by Anton Karl, as Kondrashev had never been sanctioned and the Putin list was a copy of the Forbes list. Similarly, the independent proxy advisors ISS and Ethos opposed Mark Kerekes on the grounds that he lacked sufficient competence. The General Meeting followed the proposal of the Board of Directors and voted with 64.7% against the election of Mark Kerekes.

As a result of the ongoing public dispute, CEO Hans Brändle and Chairman Remo Lütolf announced their resignation. The CEO of the largest shareholder, Anton Karl, appointed Sentis Capital employee Mark Kerekes to the Board of Directors in order to implement the required strategic change. In addition, Urs Fähndrich was elected to the top management body as a shareholder representative at the Annual General Meeting on May 13, 2020.

As a result of the extraordinary general assembly, the company announced in June 2020 that it would adapt its strategy as required by Sentis Capital, to operate as a manufacturer of solar cells and solar modules in the future. To enable this transformation, a capital increase of 165 million Swiss francs was carried out. Sentis Capital made an upfront commitment to subscribe 50 million Swiss francs. In addition, Urs Fähndrich and other investors from his circle contributed 20 to 30 million Swiss francs of the upfront commitments.

Other 
On 6 May 2020, Meyer Burger CEO Gunter Erfurt suggested to think about constructing a gigantic solar park in the Hambach open-pit coal mine in North Rhine-Westphalia. This would generate electricity with a capacity of around ten gigawatts, which would roughly correspond to the capacity of the Weisweiler, Neurath, Niederaussem and Frimmersdorf coal-fired power plants, which are currently dependent on the open-pit mines. Considerations for a later use of the gigantic area with an area of 50 square kilometres include flooding to form a lake landscape. According to Meyer Burger CEO Gunter Erfurt, it would be conceivable to cover Lake Hambach with solar modules. Up to 50 million solar modules with a capacity of 10 gigawatts could be installed as a floating solar park, as has already been realised in other parts of the world.

According to Meyer Burger CEO Gunter Erfurt the construction of a state-of-the-art plant for cell and module production in Germany is currently being evaluated.

German physicist Uwe Rau confirmed that such a project is feasible and that a major advantage of the Hambach open-pit coal mine is that power transmission lines are already in place and can be used because of the power plants.

RWE Power AG announced in May 2020 that photovoltaic projects for the Sophienhöhe are conceivable.

Andreas Pinkwart, Minister for Economic Affairs, Innovation, Digitisation and Energy of North Rhine-Westphalia, also expressed his support for the project.

See also 
 List of photovoltaics companies

References

External links
 www.meyerburger.com

Photovoltaics manufacturers
Solar energy companies
Engineering companies of Switzerland
Swiss brands
Thun